Julie Macpherson is a professor of chemistry at the University of Warwick. In 2017 she was awarded the Royal Society Innovation award for her research into boron doped diamond electrochemical sensors.

Education 
Macpherson completed her bachelor's degree in chemistry at the University of Warwick. She struggled to choose between chemistry and physics as an undergraduate. She completed her PhD at the University of Warwick under the supervision of Professor Pat Unwin. Her doctoral research concentrated on the development of the scanning electrochemical microscope and developing means to understand microscope dissolution.

Research and career 
Macpherson was appointed a Royal Society University Research fellow in 1999, and earned a faculty position in 2000. For her postdoctoral research she switched topics from scanning probe microscopy, and instead concentrated on the creation hydrodynamic microelectrodes, including the micro-jet and radial flow micro-ring electrodes. She was promoted to reader in 2004 and professor in 2007.

Macpherson's current research focuses on developing novel electrochemical sensors based on carbon allotropes (diamond, nanotubes, graphene) for applications in healthcare, environmental monitoring and pharmaceutical analysis. She is using 3D printing and lithography to create the sensors. Her group are also identifying advanced scanning probe microscopy techniques for imaging surfaces for fuel cell catalysis, as well as investigating their sensors.

In 2014 she was awarded a Royal Society Industry Fellowship in recognition of her contributions to diamond electrochemistry. The fellowship allows Macpherson to develop all-diamond polycrystalline electrochemical sensors and combined electrochemical / spectroscopic technologies for identification of trace metals for contamination monitoring. She works in partnership with Element Six, a de Beers group company. Her interdisciplinary team grown synthetic diamonds in a laboratory and process them for novel applications.

In 2017 Macpherson was award the Royal Society Innovation award, worth £250,000, for her research into using boron doped diamond (BDD) as sensor for pH and chlorine for water quality control. BDD is a semiconductor doped with degenerated boron, with semi-metallic characteristics. She is co-director of the collaborative multi-institution Centre for Diamond Science and Technology.

Macpherson has published over 200 peer-reviewed articles and has a H-index of 46. She has filed 15 patents.

Awards 
Macpherson has won many prestigious awards for her teaching and research. She has won the University of Warwick Andrew McCamley Prize, awarded to the best undergraduate lecturer, in 2001, 2003, 2007 and 2013.

2017 – Royal Society Innovation Award

2015 – The Analytical Scientist magazine Top 50 Women in Analytical Science

2007 – University of Warwick Andrew McCamley Prize

2006 – Royal Society of Chemistry McBain Medal

2005 – Royal Society of Chemistry Marlow Medal

2005 – Times Higher Education Awards Young Researcher of the Year

2003 – University of Warwick Andrew McCamley Prize

2003 – Society of Electroanalytical Chemistry Charles N. Reilley Young Investigator Award

2002 – The Observer Young Alpha Female

2001 – University of Warwick Andrew McCamley Prize

1999 – Molecular Imaging's Scanned Probe Microscopist Award

References 

21st-century chemists
British chemists
British women chemists
Royal Society University Research Fellows
Alumni of the University of Warwick
Carbon scientists
Living people
Year of birth missing (living people)